Bebearia allardi is a butterfly in the family Nymphalidae. It is found in the Democratic Republic of the Congo (central basin).

References

Butterflies described in 1989
allardi
Endemic fauna of the Democratic Republic of the Congo
Butterflies of Africa